Jasmine Dellal is a British-born film director and producer.

Early life
Jasmine Dellal was an independent film director and producer whose feature documentaries showed in cinemas, festivals and TV around the world. Her last film was in 2008, before stopping to raise a family. 

Dellal is the daughter of the Iraqi-Jewish property magnate Jack Dellal. She grew up in Great Britain, studied at Oxford, then in the United States and still spends much time in South India where her grandparents lived near Arunachala mountain in Tiruvannamalai. She read Modern Languages at Oxford University (French and Spanish, Balliol College). Dellal met her mentor, the filmmaker Marlon Riggs while doing a Masters at the University of California at Berkeley.

Career
In the 1990s, while based in San Francisco, Dellal founded Little Dust Productions, to make documentaries and artistic films with a social conscience. She has since moved to New York and London. She is particularly recognized for her work with Roma ("Gypsy" people).

Films
When the Road Bends… Tales of a Gypsy Caravan
American Gypsy: A Stranger in Everybody's Land
Freedom Writers
Utopia in Four Movements (producer)

Film awards
2008 Albert Maysles Award for Excellence  – Mendocino Film Festival for When the Road Bends: Tales of a Gypsy Caravan
2007 AUDIENCE AWARD winner  – San Francisco Independent Film Fest for When the Road Bends: Tales of a Gypsy Caravan
2007 Impact of Music JURY AWARD winner – Nashville Independent Film Festival for When the Road Bends: Tales of a Gypsy Caravan
2007  KOREA -Jeonju International Film Festival – Audience Award for When the Road Bends: Tales of a Gypsy Caravan
Flanders International Film Festival: Audience Award for When the Road Bends: Tales of a Gypsy Caravan
2000 San Francisco International Film Festival Golden Spire Award for American Gypsy: A Stranger in Everybody's Land
1999 Atlanta Film Festival Jury Award for American Gypsy: A Stranger in Everybody's Land

See also
 Suzanne Dellal Centre for Dance and Theatre, Tel Aviv

References

External links
 Little Dust Productions Film Company
 American Gypsy website
When the Road Bends: Tales of a Gypsy Caravan website

British film directors
British film producers
British film editors
Year of birth missing (living people)
Living people
Alumni of Balliol College, Oxford
University of California, Berkeley alumni
British people of Iraqi-Jewish descent
British Jews
British women film directors
British women film producers
British women film editors